Carrapatoso is a Portuguese surname. Notable people with the surname include:

Eurico Carrapatoso (born 1962), Portuguese composer
Ruben Carrapatoso (born 1981), Brazilian racing driver

Portuguese-language surnames